The Singles: 1969–1981 is a compilation of the Carpenters' music released by Richard Carpenter in 2000. A SACD was also made with the same name but with some difference in the track listing. In June 2016, the album was certified Gold in the United Kingdom for sales of 100,000
copies sold.

Track listing
Regular CD:
"For All We Know" (from Carpenters) – 2:32
"I Believe You" (from Made in America) – 3:54
"It's Going to Take Some Time" (from A Song for You) – 2:59
"We've Only Just Begun" (from Close to You) – 3:04
"Those Good Old Dreams" (from Made in America) – 4:12
"Superstar" (from Carpenters) – 3:46
"Rainy Days and Mondays" (from Carpenters) – 3:33
"Goodbye to Love" (from A Song for You) – 3:55
"All You Get from Love Is a Love Song" (from Passage) – 3:46
"Top of the World" (from A Song for You) – 2:58
"Only Yesterday" (from Horizon) – 3:47
"Ticket to Ride" (from Ticket to Ride) – 4:09
"Hurting Each Other" (from A Song for You) – 2:47
"Yesterday Once More" (from Now & Then) – 3:57
"Sing" (from Now & Then) – 3:18
"Touch Me When We're Dancing" (from Made in America) – 3:20
"Please Mr. Postman" (from Horizon) – 2:47
"I Need to Be in Love" (from A Kind of Hush) – 3:49
"I Won't Last a Day Without You" (from A Song for You) – 4:29
"(They Long to Be) Close to You" (from Close to You) – 3:40
"For All We Know" (Reprise) (from the TV special Tom Jones London Bridge Special) – 0:46
SACD:
"Yesterday Once More" (from Now & Then) 
"We've Only Just Begun" (from Close to You) 
"Superstar" (from Carpenters) 
"Rainy Days and Mondays" (from Carpenters) 
"Goodbye to Love" (from A Song for You) 
"I Believe You" (from Made in America) 
"It's Going to Take Some Time" (from A Song for You) 
"This Masquerade" (from Now & Then) 
"Ticket to Ride" (from Ticket to Ride) 
"Top of the World" (from A Song for You) 
"Only Yesterday" (from Horizon) 
"Hurting Each Other" (from A Song for You)
"Please Mr. Postman" (from Horizon)
"Merry Christmas Darling" (from Christmas Portrait)
"Sing" (from Now & Then)
"Bless The Beasts and Children" (from A Song for You) 
"I Won't Last a Day Without You" (from A Song for You)
"Touch Me When We're Dancing" (from Made in America)
"For All We Know" (from Carpenters)
"(They Long to Be) Close to You" (from Close to You)
"Calling Occupants of Interplanetary Craft" (from Passage)

Personnel
Bernie Grundman – CD and SACD mastering at Bernie Grundman Mastering

Charts

References

The Carpenters compilation albums
2000 greatest hits albums